Marshal Timoshenko was a Project 1134A Berkut A (NATO reporting name Kresta II) class cruiser of the Soviet Navy. The eighth ship of her class, the vessel served during the Cold War with the Northern Fleet, often operating in the Atlantic Ocean but also travelling to various ports in the Mediterranean and Red Seas. The cruiser was taken out of service to be modernised in 1988 but a lack of funds meant the work was not completed. Instead Marshal Timoshenko was decommissioned in 1992.

Design 

Marshal Timoshenko was the eighth ship of her class of ten Project 1134A Berkut A (NATO reporting name Kresta II-class) cruisers, designed by Vasily Anikeyev. They were designated as Large Anti-Submarine Ships in accordance with their primary mission of countering NATO submarines.

She displaced 5,600 tons standard, 6,500 tons light and 7,535 full load, and had a complement of 343. The ship was equipped with a hangar aft to carry a single Kamov Ka-25 Hormone-A helicopter.

Armament 
For her primary role as an anti-submarine cruiser, Marshal Timoshenko mounted two quadruple launchers for eight anti-submarine missiles in the Metel anti-ship complex. She was also equipped with two RBU-6000 12-barrel and two RBU-1000 6-barrel rocket launchers to protect against close-in threats. The Ka-25 helicopter embarked on the cruiser was also capable of aiding in the search and destruction of submarines.

Marshal Timoshenko was armed with four AK-725  L/80 DP guns situated in two twin mountings to protect against aerial threats. The vessel also had four  AK-630 CIWS mountings, and was armed with two twin launchers for the 48 V-611 surface-to-air missiles they carried in the M-11 Shtorm system. She also mounted two quintuple mountings for  dual-role torpedoes.

Electronics warfare 
Marshal Timoshenko was equipped with the MR-600 Voskhod (NATO code name Top Sail) early warning air search radar, the MR-310U Angara-M (NATO code name Head Net C) search radar, and the Volga (NATO code names Don Kay and Don-2) navigational radar. For anti-submarine warfare she had improved MG-332T Titan-2T hull mounted sonar. For fire control purposes she had Grom-M for the surface-to-air missiles, MR-103 Bars for the AK725 and MR-123 Vympel for the AK-630. Marshal Timoshenko also had a MG-26 communications outfit and a MG-35 Shtil sonar.

Construction 
Built in the Zhdanov Shipyard with the serial number 728, Marshal Timoshenko, named for Soviet World War II army commander Semyon Timoshenko, was laid down on 2 November 1972 and launched on 21 October 1973.

References

Citations

Bibliography

External links 
  Marshal Timoshenko photographs on navsource.narod.ru
  Marshal Timoshenko photo album on kresta-ii.ucoz.ru

1973 ships
Kresta II-class cruisers
Ships built at Severnaya Verf
Cold War cruisers of the Soviet Union